Givaudan is a Swiss multinational manufacturer of flavours, fragrances and active cosmetic ingredients. As of 2008, it is the world's largest company in the flavour and fragrance industries.

Overview
The company's scents and flavours are developed for food and beverage makers, and also used in household goods, as well as grooming and personal care products and perfumes. 

The company has two business areas: 

 Taste & Wellbeing offers flavours, taste, functional and nutritional solutions for the food industry (savoury, dairy, sweets and beverages).

 Fragrance & Beauty creates fragrances and develop beauty and wellbeing solutions for personal care, fabric care, hygiene, home care, fine fragrances, and beauty.

Givaudan's flavours and fragrances are usually custom-made and sold under confidentiality agreements. Givaudan uses ScentTrek, a technology that captures the chemical makeup of smell from living plants. The company has locations in Europe, Africa and the Middle East, North America, Latin America and Asia Pacific. In 2022, Givaudan had sales of CHF 7.1 billion. It is one of Switzerland's 30 biggest listed companies in terms of market capitalization. In 2021, Givaudan placed first on FoodTalks' Global Top 50 Food Flavours and Fragrances Companies list. 

The company’s purpose of ‘Creating for happier, healthier lives with love for nature. Let’s imagine together’ is focused in four domains: creations, nature, people and communities. The company's ambitions include doubling its business through creations that contribute to happier, healthier lives by 2030, becoming climate positive before 2050, becoming a leading employer for inclusion before 2025 and sourcing all materials and services in a way that protects the environment and people by 2030. Givaudan’s purpose goal areas are in line with its strategy and ambitions for 2025. 

Givaudan is a member of the European Flavour Association. Major competitors include Firmenich, International Flavors and Fragrances and Symrise.

History
From its historic roots in Grasse in 1768 to the acquisition of Custom Essence in 2021, Givaudan has pursued an historic policy of invention and acquisition, of creativity, passion and innovation, enriching the world of scents and taste. The company was founded as a perfumery company in 1895 in Lyon, France by Leon and Xavier Givaudan. In 1898, Givaudan moved to Geneva, Switzerland and constructed a factory in Vernier. In 1946, Givaudan opened a perfumery school, which trained a third of the world's creative perfumers. In 1948 the company acquired Ersolko SA, which transitioned Givaudan also into the flavor industry. In 1963, Givaudan was acquired by Roche and in 1964, Roche acquired one of Givaudan's competitors, Roure. Roure was founded in Grasse, France during 1820. In 1937 Roure created the first designer perfume: Schocking for Schiaparelli. Givaudan's original United States fragrance headquarters, in Teaneck, New Jersey, was built in 1972 from a design by Der Scutt, architect of the Trump Tower. The company later moved to East Hanover, New Jersey.

Givaudan-Roure
In 1991 Givaudan and Roure were merged to form Givaudan-Roure. Also in 1991, the company bought Fritzsche, Dodge and Olcott. In 1997 Givaudan-Roure acquired another flavour company, Tastemaker, based in Cincinnati, Ohio. The merger made Givaudan the largest flavour company in the world. In 2000 Givaudan-Roure was spun off by Roche as Givaudan and listed on the Swiss Stock Exchange (Code GIVN.VX) where it is part of the SLI.

2000s
In 2002 Givaudan acquired FIS, the flavours division of Nestle, for which Nestle received a 10% stake in the company. The following year, Givaudan purchased the cheese flavor company IBF. In 2004 the company expanded its operations in China, which had been in place since the 1990s.

On 22 November 2006, Givaudan announced the acquisition of Quest International to be completed Q1 2007. On 21 February 2007, the EU approved the merger of Givaudan and Quest, clearing the final regulatory hurdle for the merger after the United States authorities approved the merger earlier in the month. The merger deal closed on 2 March 2007. The acquisition makes Givaudan the global leader in both fine fragrances and consumer products; it was already the global leader in flavours and the acquisition of Quest International strengthens their position. The acquisition of Quest boosted Givaudan's sales by 42% from CHF 2,909 million in 2006 to CHF 4,132 million in 2007.

In 2013 Nestle sold its share in Givaudan for $1.3 billion. By 2014 the company had about US$4.6 billion in revenues. That year, the company had its first acquisition since Quest, purchasing Soliance. Givaudan also released the TasteSolutions Richness line of flavours. It also launched the Givaudan Foundation, and has a programme that works with patchouli and other grower collection networks to establish sustainable development practices, called the Innovative Naturals programme. 

Since 2014, Givaudan has acquired around 20 companies, among them Naturex, the cosmetics business of AMSilk, Albert Vieille, Fragrance Oils, and Golden Frog.

In 2022, Givaudan, the mechanical engineering company Bühler, and Migros want to open the Cultured Food Innovation Hub in Kemptthal. Research is also to be carried out there on cultivated meat.

Givaudan and the environment
On July 10, 1976 the Seveso accident, Italy's worst ecological disaster, released a toxic cloud into the atmosphere. Italy's highest court awarded moral damages to the residents for anxiety incurred. Givaudan, the parent company of ICMESA paid EUR103.9 million (US$90.3 million) in cleanup costs and compensation to those who suffered physical injuries as a result of the incident.

Sustainability journey 

Givaudan's current sustainability journey began in 2009, building on the company's 250 heritage. In 2010 Givaudan pronounced its support for the United Nations Global Compact and in 2015 it became a member of RE100; committing to 100% renewable electricity by 2025. As of the end of 2022, the company had attained 90% renewable electricity. In 2017 Givaudan set GHG emissions targets in line with the Science-Based Targets Initiative (SBTi) as well as committing to contribute to the UN's Sustainable Development Goals (SDGs). 

In 2019, Givaudan announced a new approach to sustainability with the launch of its purpose; Creating for happier, healthier lives with love for nature. Let's imagine together', supported by targets and ambitions in the areas of creations, people, nature and communities. During 2019 Givaudan aligned its targets to the UN's Business Ambition for 1.5 degrees. As at the end of 2022, Givaudan had cut its scope 1 and 2 emissions by 35% compared with a baseline of 2015 and its scope 3 emissions by 1% in the same timeframe. In 2021 the company published its Human Rights Policy and further enhanced its approach to Responsible Sourcing with the launch of its Sourcing4Good programme. As of April 2022, there were 24 flagship projects running at the advanced (highest) level of this programme, including projects being delivered in collaboration with the Givaudan Foundation and with external partners such as Earthworm Foundation. 

Learn more on how Givaudan delivered on their key non-financial targets around sustainability, diversity and safety in 2022.

Notes and references

External links
 

Chemical companies of Switzerland
Flavor companies
Fragrance companies
Swiss brands
Companies based in the canton of Geneva
Swiss companies established in 1895
Chemical companies established in 1895
Food and drink companies of Switzerland
Cosmetics companies of Switzerland
Companies listed on the SIX Swiss Exchange
Food and drink companies established in 1895
Multinational companies headquartered in Switzerland